The Hauts-Forts (2,466 m) is a mountain of the Chablais Alps, located east of Morzine in the French department of Haute-Savoie, within one kilometre of the Swiss border. 

The closest locality is Avoriaz, from where a cable car leads to its summit.

References

Mountains of Haute-Savoie
Mountains of the Alps